The Tiber Rocks are a group of rocks lying near the head of Rymill Bay, close west of the mouth of Romulus Glacier and  northwest of the highest summit of Black Thumb, off the west coast of Graham Land. First seen and roughly surveyed in 1936 by the British Graham Land Expedition (BGLE) under John Riddoch Rymill, it was resurveyed in 1948-49 by the Falkland Islands Dependencies Survey (FIDS), and so named by them because of the association of these rocks with nearby Romulus and Remus Glaciers.

Rock formations of Graham Land
Fallières Coast